Rev. Griffith Hartwell Jones (10 April 1859 – 27 May 1944) was a Welsh academic and Anglican clergyman.

He was born in Llanrhaeadr-ym-Mochnant, Denbighshire. He was educated at Jesus College, Oxford, where he was a scholar, and became professor of Latin at the University College of South Wales and Monmouthshire, Cardiff, lecturing on historical and philological topics and writing extensively.  He was also chairman of the National Eisteddfod Association, chairman of the council of the Honourable Society of Cymmrodorion and a member of the Royal Commission on the Ancient and Historical Monuments of Wales.  He died in hospital in London on 27 May 1944 at the age of 85.

References

1859 births
1944 deaths
Alumni of Jesus College, Oxford
Welsh classical scholars
Academics of Cardiff University
People from Powys